The women's 3000 metre steeplechase at the 2014 European Athletics Championships took place at the Letzigrund on 15 and 17 August.

Medalists

Records

Schedule

Results

Round 1

Final

References

Qualifying Round Results
Final Results

Steeplechase 3000 W
Steeplechase at the European Athletics Championships
2014 in women's athletics